Zhengying is an historic village located in Baoxiu, Shiping County, in the south of Yunnan province, China.

See also
Tuoshan village of Jianshui
Shaxi, Yunnan

References

Villages in Yunnan
Honghe Hani and Yi Autonomous Prefecture